Tympanobasis is a genus of moths of the family Noctuidae. The genus was erected by George Hampson in 1926. The three described species live in Central America.

Species
Tympanobasis pterogoneis Hampson, 1926
Tympanobasis thyrsipalpis Hampson, 1926
Tympanobasis tumidicosta Hampson, 1926

References

Calpinae